The Tara is a river in the Novosibirsk and the Omsk Oblasts in Russia. It is a right tributary of the Irtysh in the Ob's basin. The Tara freezes up in late October or November and is frozen until late April or early May.

See also
List of rivers in Russia

References

Rivers of Novosibirsk Oblast
Rivers of Omsk Oblast